Nordic-Baltic Eight (NB8) is a regional co-operation format that includes Denmark, Estonia, Finland, Iceland, Latvia, Lithuania, Norway, and Sweden. Under NB8, regular meetings are held of the Baltic and  Nordic countries' Prime Ministers, Speakers of Parliaments, Foreign Ministers, branch ministers, Secretaries of State and political directors of Foreign Ministries, as well as expert consultations where regional issues and current international topics are reviewed.

History
Historically, the countries of the region have been interlinked and interacted for centuries, with mutual trade being the decisive factor facilitating this interaction. The most profound bond, however was created during the 1990s.
 
The Nordic Council first contacted Baltic parliamentarians in around 1989. Official co-operation began in November 1991, when the Nordic Council attended the inaugural meeting of the Baltic Assembly in Tallinn. A formal co-operation agreement between the Nordic Council and the Baltic Assembly was signed in 1992.

The Nordic countries were amongst the strongest supporters of the Baltic countries' independence and later they were the first to open their borders, introducing visa-free regimes with the Baltic countries.

When Baltic countries regained their independence and during their integration into the European and transatlantic structures, they were strongly supported by their Nordic neighbors. The Nordic-Baltic co-operation took place in various levels: networking and cooperation were established among politicians, civil servants and civil societies. The Nordic countries actively assisted the Baltic countries in their preparations for integration into the European Union and NATO.

Named as 5+3 in the beginning of cooperation (five Nordic countries plus three Baltic States), the format changed its name and scope of cooperation. During the meeting of the Ministers of Foreign Affairs of the Baltic States and Nordic Countries on 30 August 2000 in Middelfart (Denmark), the Ministers decided that the meetings of the Ministers of the Baltic States and Nordic Countries will be called NB8.

Nordic–Baltic countries today

The Nordic–Baltic community is one of the three main communities in Northern Europe: these are Nordic, Baltic and Baltic Sea Region.

The Nordic–Baltic region has some 33 million inhabitants, and a combined GDP of close to $2.0 trillion, which makes it the tenth-largest population and fifth-largest economy in Europe. Furthermore, the region features relatively low levels of corruption; with the Nordic countries being some of the least corrupt countries in the world. Also, the countries of the region place well in various international freedom rankings, with several of the states at the absolute top. The Nordic–Baltic countries also do well in surveys that measure the ease of doing business and creating new companies. The Human Development Index places many of the countries in the region among the most developed in the world.

The Nordic–Baltic region is diverse, with a wealth of natural and cultural heritage, communities, destinations and resources. The region hosts a total of 42 World Heritage sites that are experiencing increasing pressures from tourism.
The Baltic states are described as three fascinating states that have glorious beaches along an extensive coastline, medieval old towns, and beautiful natural scenery, whereas the Nordic countries own spectacular scenery of mountains, lakes, archipelagos, glaciers, geysers, forests, waterfalls and volcanoes. There is much wilderness, including extensive arctic tundra.

Coordinating countries
The coordinator's role of the NB8 was formerly assumed by the country holding the chairmanship of the Nordic Council of Ministers for the respective year. From 2008 onwards, the Baltic States have been also involved in coordinating the NB8 foreign ministry co-operation. The coordinating country manages meeting schedules and hosts many meetings of different parties and levels in the NB8 format. Each year the coordinating country also issues a Progress Report.

Coordination schedule:

 Estonia 2020
 Iceland 2019
 Sweden 2018
 Norway 2017
 Latvia 2016
 Denmark 2015
 Estonia 2014 
 Sweden 2013
 Lithuania 2012
 Finland 2011
 Latvia 2010
 Iceland 2009
 Estonia 2008

In 2013 the task of NB8 coordination was transferred to Sweden. As was assessed in a press release for the upcoming coordination by the Swedish Ministry for Foreign Affairs, the areas of focus were directed towards the following: 1.  Focus on the Eastern Partnership and joint agenda for the NB8 before the EU-summit in Vilnius, November 2013. 2.  Cooperation within energy as an area of mutual interests, especially as a monitor of energy-related issues within other forums. The task of arranging most of the NB8 meetings and events in Sweden was assigned to the Swedish Ministry for Foreign Affairs.

In 2014, NB8 coordinator was Estonia with priorities being cyber cooperation, Eastern Partnership, energy cooperation, and security cooperation. In 2014 Estonia was also the coordinator for Baltic Cooperation and Council of the Baltic Sea States. Coordination of these three formats was named as the "Baltic Sea Year".

In 2015, Denmark's NB8 priorities are energy security, media in relation to Russian-speakers, the Ukraine conflict and the Eastern Partnership.

In 2016, Latvia's NB8 priorities were the strengthening of security (including strengthening of energy security, promotion of strategic communication, reinforcing cyber security, fight against hybrid threats) and support for the EU Eastern Partnership.

In 2017, the coordinating country was Norway. The priorities were set in regional issues (regional security, hybrid and resilience issues, cybersecurity, open and free media, strategic communication, energy security and energy markets, EU Eastern Partnership, attention to the Estonian Presidency of the Council of the EU, economic development, competitiveness and innovation, synergies among Nordic 5, NB6 and Nordic Council of Ministers). The other set of priorities was based in broader strategic issues (transatlantic relations (United States, NATO, Euro-Atlantic bonds), the future of the European Union, Brexit, migration, the Bratislava process), Russia, UN issues (including the Security Council) and terrorism.

In 2020, Estonia coordinated both the NB8 as well as the Baltic Council of Ministers. Its priorities in both settings were regional security, including the Eastern Partnership, transatlantic relations; cyber cooperation; connectivity, including regional energy and transport projects and digital cooperation; climate change and environmental issues; and cultural and health cooperation.

NB8 format
On the political level, co-operation in the NB8 format is conducted primarily in the form of annual meetings of the Prime Ministers and Foreign Ministers. The Foreign Ministers' meetings have taken place since 1993. In addition to the foreign ministers and prime ministers, other ministers and ministry officials also meet on a regular basis. In the realm of foreign policy, there are many meetings held in addition to the annual meeting of the foreign ministers. The secretaries general, political directors, and experts in various fields from the foreign ministries also get together regularly, and there are frequent meetings of diplomats in foreign representations within the NB8 format.

During the recent years the Baltic and Nordic countries have developed a cohesive network of cooperation activities in political, military, economic, environmental, cultural and other aspects. After double the EU and NATO enlargement in 2004 the cooperation is becoming closer thereby activating the vast potential for development in the Baltic Sea region. Several examples of such evolved cooperation is the work of NB8 Task Force against Trafficking in Human Beings and the creation of the common Nordic – Baltic education and research area.

On 17 August 2010, the financial supervisory authorities, central banks, finance ministries and other relevant ministries of Denmark, Estonia, Finland, Iceland, Latvia, Lithuania, Norway and Sweden signed a cross-border agreement on financial stability. The Nordic-Baltic Cooperation Agreement on Cross-border Financial Stability enhanced cooperation by establishing routines and procedures for information sharing and coordination. The aim is to reduce the risk of a financial crisis spreading cross-border, and to enhance possibilities to reach an efficient crisis management. By signing the agreement, the public authorities in the Nordic and Baltic countries increase their preparedness to handle problems in cross-border banks. The NB8 countries are jointly represented in the World Bank and International Monetary Fund. The Baltic states are members of the Nordic Investment Bank.

The Baltic states—Lithuania, Latvia and Estonia—have achieved an exceptional level of a trilateral co-operation, which, by its depth and intensity, can be compared to the Nordic co-operation. Three Baltic states have established the Baltic Council of Ministers as well as the Baltic Assembly, whereas the integration of the Nordic countries has achieved an unprecedented level in the past forty years since the Nordic Council of Ministers was established in 1971. Cooperation among the parliamentarians of the Baltic Assembly and the Nordic Council dates back to 1989.

The Nordic Council of Ministers offices opened in the three Baltic capitals (Tallinn, Riga and Vilnius) in 1991 play a key role in the dynamic Nordic–Baltic co-operation.

Guidelines for the Nordic Council of Ministers' Co-operation with Estonia, Latvia and Lithuania from 2014
The Nordic Council of Ministers' co-operation with Estonia, Latvia and Lithuania is directed by guidelines agreed by the Nordic Ministers for Co-operation in July 2013 and adopted by the Nordic Council in October 2013. These express a desire to develop Nordic-Baltic co-operation in areas of common interest and thus strengthen work towards political stability and a strong economy in the Baltic Sea Region.

The Nordic Council of Ministers has a special interest in developing certain key areas which include the following central themes in particular:
 Education, research and innovation
 Business, cluster co-operation and creative industries
 The environment, climate and energy, including environmental conditions in the Baltic Sea and the promotion of effective environmental technologies and renewable sources of energy
 The international challenges faced by welfare societies. Possible areas of co-operation include combating human trafficking and the spread of HIV/AIDS; improving co-operation between police forces and public prosecution services; developing hospital services; and addressing demographic challenges in relation to, e.g. labour-market policy.
 Cross-border regional co-operation to promote joint fundamental values, such as democracy, good governance, gender equality, freedom of speech and tolerance – both under Nordic–Baltic auspices and in relation to other neighbouring countries, including Belarus.

NB8 Wise Men Report

During the co-ordination of the co-operation among the NB-8 Foreign Ministries in 2012, Latvia initiated the preparation of a comprehensive analysis and recommendation how to advance the Nordic-Baltic co-operation. Latvia, presiding over the Baltic Council of Ministers in 2010, and Denmark, chairman of the  Nordic Council of Ministers in 2010, nominated two high level representatives (rapporteurs) – former Latvian Prime Minister and Foreign Minister Mr Valdis Birkavs representing the Baltic countries and former Danish Minister of Defense Mr Søren Gade representing the Nordic countries – to provide the respective analysis. Before compiling the NB8 Co-operation Report (NB8 Wise Men Report), which was completed in August 2010, the rapporteurs made a very intensive consultation process with representatives from all the NB8 countries. Practical implementation of the Wise Men's 38 recommendations is ongoing. 
Concrete suggestions were made in the following fields: 
 Foreign political dialogue. 
 Cooperation on diplomatic representations. 
 Civil security, including cyber security. 
 Defense cooperation. 
 Energy. 
 The NB8 brand.
The Birkavs - Gade report with the initial recommendations has been presented for the NB8 Ministerial meeting in Helsinki on 26–27 August 2011. A number of other Birkavs - Gade report recommendations have been or are being implemented consecutively.

Reinforced diplomatic cooperation between the Nordic and Baltic countries
One of the Birkavs - Gade recommendations proposed that sharing diplomatic facilities is a way of increasing diplomatic representation in parts of the world where budgetary constraints and priorities would otherwise have prevented such representation. At the same time extended cooperation in this field could also contribute to making NB8 cooperation more visible. More should therefore be done in the area of joint diplomatic representation. A first step could be the setting up of an informal clearing house where the NB8 countries could share information about opportunities for housing other NB8 countries' diplomats.

On 30 August 2011 the Nordic and Baltic Ministers of Foreign Affairs signed a Memorandum of Understanding on the posting of diplomats at each other's missions abroad. The Memorandum made it easier for the Nordic and Baltic countries to maintain a diplomatic presence around the world by enabling flexible and cost-effective solutions. This reinforced diplomatic cooperation coincided with the twentieth anniversary of Estonia, Latvia and Lithuania regaining their freedom and re-establishing diplomatic relations with other countries. The memorandum regulates the diplomatic and practical aspects of posting diplomats to the mission abroad of another Nordic or Baltic country.

NB6 - cooperation among Nordic and Baltic EU Member States
Since 1 May 2004, six Nordic and Baltic countries (Denmark, Sweden, Finland, Estonia, Latvia and Lithuania) are the European Union members. Regular informal NB6 Prime Ministers' meetings on EU matters take place on the eve of Council meetings as well as Foreign Affairs Ministers of these six countries meet on the eve of General Affairs Council and Foreign Affairs Council meetings.

Enhanced Partnership in Northern Europe (e-PINE) 
Launched in 2003, e-PINE is a format in which the NB8 and the United States Political Directors of the Ministries of Foreign Affairs meet. Cooperation takes place in three major areas: cooperative security, healthy societies and vibrant economies.

Northern Future Forum 

The Northern Future Forum is an annual, informal meeting of Prime Ministers, policy makers, entrepreneurs and business leaders from the NB8 countries and the United Kingdom. Initially referred to as UK-Nordic-Baltic Summit, the name Northern Future Forum was introduced at the second meeting in Stockholm. Northern Future Forum has been hosted in London (2011), Stockholm (2012), Riga (2013), Helsinki (2014), and in Reykjavik (2015). In 2016, it was planned to hold the event in Stavanger, Norway, but it was postponed and eventually took place in 2018.

NB8 and Visegrad Group 
NB8 and Visegrad Group countries (Czech Republic, Hungary, Poland, Slovakia) Ministers of Foreign Affairs have been meeting since 2013. The first meeting was held in Gdansk, Poland. In 2014 the ministers met in Narva, Estonia; in 2015 - in High Tatras at Štrbské Pleso, Slovakia. In 2016, the meeting was held on the shore of the Baltic Sea in the city of Jūrmala, Latvia. In 2017, the meeting was planned to take place in spring in Poland.

Strategic partners
 Nordic Council of Ministers
 Baltic Assembly
 Nordic Council
 Council of the Baltic Sea States

See also
 Baltoscandia
 Danish Estonia
 Intermarium
 Nordic Estonia
 Swedish Estonia

References

Further reading
 Birkavs,Valdis, Gade,Soren "NB8 Wise Men Report", 2010
 Rebane,Mikk, Pajula,Merle "Nordic-Baltic Co-operation - Unity across borders", 2009
 Stoltenberg, Thorvald "Nordic cooperation on foreign and security policy", 2009

External links
 Ministry of Foreign Affairs of the Kingdom of Denmark
 Estonian Ministry Of Foreign Affairs: Nordic-Baltic Cooperation (NB8)
 Ministry of Foreign Affairs of the Republic of Finland
 Ministry of Foreign Affairs of the Republic of Iceland
 Ministry of Foreign Affairs of the Republic of Latvia
 Ministry of Foreign Affairs of the Republic of Lithuania
 Ministry of Foreign Affairs of the Kingdom of Norway
 Ministry of Foreign Affairs of the Kingdom of Sweden
 The Nordic Council of Ministers' and the Nordic Council

Baltic organizations
International organizations based in Europe
Nordic organizations
1992 establishments in Europe
Intergovernmental organizations
Bottom-up regional groups within the European Union